Jeremy Davidson may refer to:
Jeremy Davidson (actor) (born 1971), American actor, writer and director
Jeremy Davidson (rugby union) (born 1974), rugby union lock